Holocentropus is a genus of tube maker caddisflies in the family Polycentropodidae. There are more than 40 described species in Holocentropus.

Species
These 42 species belong to the genus Holocentropus:

 Holocentropus cavus Mey, 1985
 Holocentropus dubius (Rambur, 1842)
 Holocentropus flavus Banks, 1908
 Holocentropus glacialis Ross, 1938
 Holocentropus grellus Milne, 1936
 Holocentropus insignis Martynov, 1924
 Holocentropus interruptus Banks, 1914
 Holocentropus longus Banks, 1914
 Holocentropus melanae Ross, 1938
 Holocentropus omiensis Iwata, 1927
 Holocentropus picicornis (Stephens, 1836)
 Holocentropus stagnalis (Albarda, 1874)
 Holocentropus varangensis Mey, 1987
 Holocentropus vietnamellus Malicky, 1995
 † Holocentropus calcaratus Ulmer, 1912
 † Holocentropus castus Mey, 1986
 † Holocentropus consanguineus Ulmer, 1912
 † Holocentropus consobrinus Ulmer, 1912
 † Holocentropus cornutus Ulmer, 1912
 † Holocentropus curvatus Ulmer, 1912
 † Holocentropus discedens Ulmer, 1912
 † Holocentropus dugoi Ivanov & Melnitsky, 2013
 † Holocentropus echinatus Ulmer, 1912
 † Holocentropus flexiflagrum Melnitsky & Ivanov, 2010
 † Holocentropus fundamentalis Ivanov & Melnitsky, 2013
 † Holocentropus horribilis Mey, 1986
 † Holocentropus incurvatus Mey, 1986
 † Holocentropus kobodok Melnitsky & Ivanov, 2013
 † Holocentropus lanciger Ulmer, 1912
 † Holocentropus omega Ulmer, 1912
 † Holocentropus operarius Mey, 1986
 † Holocentropus peregrinator Ivanov & Melnitsky, 2013
 † Holocentropus perlatus Ulmer, 1912
 † Holocentropus proximorepertus Ivanov & Melnitsky, 2013
 † Holocentropus scissus Ulmer, 1912
 † Holocentropus spurius Botosaneanu & Wichard, 1983
 † Holocentropus telergon Ivanov & Melnitsky, 2013
 † Holocentropus uncatus Ulmer, 1912
 † Holocentropus zhiltsovae Melnitsky & Ivanov, 2013
 † Polycentropus affinis (Pictet & Hagen, 1856)
 † Polycentropus atratus (Pictet & Hagen, 1856)
 † Polycentropus incertus (Pictet & Hagen, 1856)

References

Further reading

 
 
 

Trichoptera genera
Articles created by Qbugbot